Sahlah bint Suhail was a sahabiyah of the Islamic prophet Muhammad. She was married to Abu Hudaifah ibn Utbah.  They had an adoptive son named Salim mawla Abu Hudaifa.
She was amongst the women who migrated to Abyssinia. She migrated with her husband Abu hudhaifah ra. While in Abyssinia she gave birth to his (Abu Hudhaifah) son Muhammad ibn Abu Hudhaifah.

References

Women companions of the Prophet